Gamma Alpha Chi was a professional advertising fraternity for women founded in 1920.

History
Gamma Alpha Chi was formed on February 9, 1920 at the University of Missouri Founding members include Ruth Prather, Beatrice Watts, Ella Wyatt, Alfreda Halligan, Elizabeth Atteberry, Allene Richardson,. Mary McKee, May Miller, Ruth Taylor, Rowena Reed, Selma Stein, Lulu Crum, Lucille Gross, Frances Chapman, Betty Etter, Mildred Roetzel, Christine Hood and Christine Gabriel.

On  it merged with Alpha Delta Sigma, a professional advertising men's fraternity, also formed at the University of Missouri.

By 1973, now a combined professional advertising fraternity for men and women,  would go on to merge its chapters into the American Advertising Federation, to become AAF's collegiate outreach and national honor society branch.

Insignia and traditions
The colors of Gamma Alpha Chi were gold and brown 
The pin was a shield, with a fountain pen at a diagonal behind the shield.  Originally the pen had been on the horizontal axis, but some time after 1928 was changed to a diagonal.  Symbols also included a star, and an image of the Western Hemisphere behind the letters, rendered in gold, on a black field.
The flower of Gamma Alpha Chi was the Yellow Rose.

Chapters
Chapters of Gamma Alpha Chi included
Alpha - University of Missouri - 
Beta - University of Texas - 
Gamma - University of Washington - 
Delta - University of Illinois -  - (Inactive 1940-1945)
Epsilon - University of Nebraska -  (Inactive 1941-1949)
Zeta - University of Oregon - 
Eta - University of Southern California - 
Theta - Washington State University -  (Inactive 1945)
Iota - University of California -  (Inactive 1931)
*Lambda - University of Iowa -  
Mu - University of Oklahoma - 
Nu - University of Kansas - 
Xi - Syracuse University -  (Inactive 1955)
Omicron - Roosevelt University -  (Inactive 1950)
Pi - Indiana University - - 
Rho - Butler University -  (Inactive 1954)
Sigma - C.C.N.Y. - 
Tau - UCLA -  (Inactive 1950)
Upsilon - San Jose State University - 
Phi - University of Colorado - 
Chi - Ohio State University - 
Psi - University of Miami - 
Omega - Southern Methodist University - 
Alpha Alpha - University of Wisconsin - 
Alpha Beta - University of Houston -  (inactive 1954-1961)
Alpha Gamma - University of Florida - 
Alpha Delta - Florida State University - 
Alpha Epsilon - Fordham University - 
Alpha Zeta - University of Georgia - 
Alpha Eta, Temple University -  
Alpha Theta, Marquette University -   
Alpha Iota, Arizona State University  - 
Alpha Kappa, Michigan State  - 
Alpha Lambda, Texas Tech  - 
Alpha Mu, University of Arizona  - 
Alpha Nu, University of Texas - 
Alpha Xi, University of Maryland - 
Alpha Omicron, Long Beach State University -  
Alpha Pi, N.Y.U. - 
Alpha Rho, Chico State University -

References

Honor societies
Student organizations established in 1920
1920 establishments in Missouri